John Gregory Roncz (born 1948) is an inventor, businessman, computer expert, book author, and aerodynamicist. Roncz designed the sail for the racing yacht Stars and Stripes, which won the 1988 America’s Cup, and  worked on Steve Fossett’s Virgin Atlantic GlobalFlyer aircraft.

External links

Wingtip for a General Aviation Aircraft (patent application) - John Roncz

References

Wing Man (David Noland, Air & Space, December 1990/January 1991, pp. 34–40)

Aviation pioneers
1948 births
People from Indiana
American aerospace engineers
American aviators
Aviation inventors
Living people